Power Rangers: Legacy Wars is a fighting video game based on the 2017 film Power Rangers, created by San Franciscobased game developer nWay with characters from the movie and the TV show. The game was featured on Amazon, Apple's AppStore and Google Play Store. The game has been downloaded more than 50 million times.

Plot
Set in the universe of the 2017 Power Rangers film, Rita Repulsa infects the Morphin Grid with a virus that brings together and corrupts all known Ranger generations. Zordon and Alpha 5 send Jason to cleanse the Morphin Grid. Jason saves various Rangers and together with them goes on to save more and takedown Rita, meeting various threats along the way. Eventually, the Rangers find a few Megazords, which they use to challenge Mega Goldar and the Black Dragon Megazord. However, Rita's power is growing, and she is able to now pull fighters from other dimensions into the Grid. She finds the remains of M. Bison and reanimates him. In return, he gives Rita his dimension to conquer. Ryu senses this, but it's too late, and he and his friends and enemies are pulled into the Morphin Grid.

Gameplay
Power Rangers Legacy Wars is an online tag team-based fighting game. Players select a primary character (a Leader) and two supporting characters (Assists) that can be called in during combat. Players can also challenge computer players in Training Mode. Characters' move-sets are based on color-coded "cards." Each card has a different attack type: Strike, Defense, Breaker. They work in a rock-paper-scissors form. Strike beats Breaker, Breaker beats Defense, and Defense beats Strike. When constructing a team, players must keep their team builds in mind, as an imbalance of cards leaves one vulnerable to counterattack (too many "Strike" cards leaves one vulnerable to "Defense," and so forth). Players can complete challenges to win Morph Boxes and can use the earned items to upgrade their Leaders and Assists. Corruption Boxes can be unlocked via points earned in PvP battles.

On October 19, 2017, Megazord battles were introduced. The gameplay is nearly identical to Warrior battles, but blocking is nonexistent, replaced with Defense attacks. Also, a Megazord is required to have power-ups, called "Megas" which the Megazord can access when it has dealt and/or taken enough damage.

In May 2018, guest fighters Ryu, Guile, Chun-Li, Akuma, Cammy and M. Bison from the Street Fighter franchise were introduced. The following July, an original fighter known as Ryu Ranger (a morphed version of Street Fighter's Ryu) was introduced into the game. In November 2019, an original fighter known as Chun-Li Ranger (a morphed version of Street Fighter's Chun-Li) was introduced into the game.

As of December 2021, Legacy Wars has 107 characters consisting of Rangers, allies, villains, and guests. These 107 characters include 15 premium characters. The game currently has 9 Megazords: 2 common, 2 rare, 2 epics, and 3 legendary.

Power Rangers: Legacy Wars – Street Fighter Showdown 
Power Rangers: Legacy Wars – Street Fighter Showdown is a short film co-produced by Allspark Pictures and Bat in the Sun and released on October 11, 2018, to promote the game and its Street Fighter content. It features Ryu and Chun Li teaming up Tommy Oliver the Mighty Morphin Green Ranger and Gia Moran the Yellow Megaforce Ranger to face off against M. Bison.

The cast features Jason David Frank as Tommy Oliver, Ciara Hanna as Gia Moran, Peter Jang as Ryu, Gemma Nguyen as Chun-Li and Kevin Porter as M. Bison.

References

External links 
 

2017 video games
Android (operating system) games
Crossover fighting games
IOS games
Superhero video games
Video games developed in the United States
Video games about parallel universes
Power Rangers video games
Street Fighter
Fighting games
Multiplayer and single-player video games
Video games set in California